The Services Committee is a select committee of the House of Lords which supports the House of Lords Commission.

Membership 
As of January 2023, the members of the committee are as follows:

References 

Committees of the House of Lords